The Sevastopol City Committee of the Communist Party of Ukraine, commonly referred to as the Sevastopol CPU gorkom, was the position of highest authority in the city of Sevastopol.

The position was created in 1954, and abolished in August 1991. 

The First Secretary was a de facto appointed position usually by the Central Committee of the Communist Party of Ukraine or the First Secretary of the Communist Party of Ukraine. The First Secretary exercised a large influence throughout the Soviet Union.

First Secretaries

See also
 Sevastopol City State Administration
 Sevastopol City Council

Notes

Sources
 World Statesmen.org

Ukrainian Soviet Socialist Republic
History of Sevastopol
City Committees of the Communist Party of Ukraine (Soviet Union)
1954 establishments in the Soviet Union
1991 disestablishments in the Soviet Union